Pratik is an Indian masculine given name that may refer to

Pratik Habib (born 1999), Hubli Karnataka
Pratik Agnihotri (born 1994), Norwegian cricketer 
Pratik Chaudhari (born 1989), Indian football player 
Pratik Das (born 1994), Indian cricketer 
Pratik Desai (born 1989), Indian cricketer
Pratik Gandhi, Indian theatre and film actor 
Pratik Prakashbapu Patil (born 1973), Indian politician
Pratik Salunke (born 1991), Indian cricketer
Pratik Sargade (born 1989), Indian cricketer
Pratik A. Shah, American lawyer 

Indian masculine given names